This is a list of seasons completed by the Northern Michigan University Wildcats men's ice hockey team.

Northern Michigan has won one NCAA Championship in its history (1991).

Season-by-season results

* Winning percentage is used when conference schedules are unbalanced.

Footnotes

References

 
Lists of college men's ice hockey seasons in the United States
Michigan sports-related lists